The Diocese of Slane was an Irish diocese created in 513  by St Erc with its seat at Slane. It was first subsumed by the Diocese of Meath and is now within the Diocese of Meath and Kildare.

Bishops

Other senior clergy

See also

References

External links
 Slane Parish
 Megalithic Ireland
Saint Erc

Religion in County Meath
Bishops of Slane
Archdeacons of Slane